Hans Henrik Andersen (May 1, 1937 in Frederiksberg, Denmark – November 3, 2012) was a professor at the Niels Bohr Institute at the University of Copenhagen (emeritus since 2004). He was the founder and subsequently co-editor of the scientific journal "Nuclear Instruments and Methods in Physics Research B".

He has made important contributions to various fields of atomic physics and solid state physics, especially in the field of the stopping power of matter for fast charged particles. The accuracy (0.3–0.5%) of his measurements is unsurpassed even today (2006). They were done by measuring the amount of heat deposited in a foil at the temperature of liquid helium (−269 °C).

Together with his collaborators, he succeeded in showing in 1969 that the stopping power for fast alpha particles is more than four times as large as that for protons. Since the atomic number (Z) of alpha particles is exactly twice as big as that of protons, that means that the stopping power is not exactly proportional to Z2, as the simple Bethe formula would have it. That was an additional proof of the existence of the Barkas effect.

Literature

References

1937 births
2012 deaths
20th-century Danish physicists
Danish nuclear physicists